Manuel M. "Manny" Guzman Jr. (born c.1988) is an American politician who is a Democratic member of the Pennsylvania House of Representatives for the 127th district (Reading, Berks County).

Background 
Guzman graduated from Reading High School and studied Professional, Technical, Business, and Scientific Writing at Kutztown University.

Political career 
Guzman was elected to the Reading School Board in 2013 to a four-year term. In 2017, Guzman won the Democratic primary for Reading City Council's District 1. However, Guzman lived in a different district and was removed from the ballot.
 In 2018, he lost in the 127th district Democratic Primary, to incumbent Thomas R. Caltagirone. Guzman served as the Coalitions Director with the Pennsylvania Democratic Party from 2018 to January 2020 and as was appointed Deputy Coalitions Director for Latino Engagement in Pennsylvania for  Joe Biden's presidential campaign.
 On January 28, 2020, he announced his candidacy for 127th, after the announcement of incumbent Caltagirone's retirement, who then endorsed Guzman.

Guzman currently sits on the Appropriations, Environmental Resources & Energy, Gaming Oversight, Liquor Control, and Professional Licensure committees.

References

Hispanic and Latino American people in Pennsylvania politics
Hispanic and Latino American politicians
Hispanic and Latino American state legislators in Pennsylvania
Kutztown University of Pennsylvania alumni
Politicians from Reading, Pennsylvania
Living people
1988 births
Democratic Party members of the Pennsylvania House of Representatives